"Down and Out" is a song written and recorded by the American rock band Tantric, the song was released in the first quarter of 2008 as the lead single from their third studio album titled The End Begins. This song made the first single the band released with their new label Silent Majority Group.

Charts

References

2008 singles
2008 songs
Tantric (band) songs
Songs written by Hugo Ferreira